The Armed Forces of Bolivia has four main branches: Army, Navy, Air Force and the National Police Force. Each of the four branches has a similar structure, each having four pay grades: non-commissioned officers, senior non-commissioned officers, commissioned officers and general staff.  However, the SNCO roles vary depending on the branch; some of these hold specialisations.

Army 
The Army trains all its personnel in the following:

 Army NCO School, Sucre
 Military College of Bolivia, La Paz

Officer ranks

Enlisted ranks

Navy 
Despite being a landlocked country, Bolivia has a large quantity of rivers and lakes which the majority of their naval operations take place on, one example of this is Lake Titicaca, which is shared between Bolivia and Peru.

The Navy, unlike the other three branches, has different specialisations for the NCOs and SNCOs once they reach the rank of 'seaman'. Once a specialisation has been achieved, the sailors' insignia will be adjusted slightly, to make his/her profession more visible. Those corps are as follows:
 Machinist Corps
 Medical Corps
 Divers Corps
 Logistics Corps
 Quartermasters Corps
 Signals Corps

Any rank between Seaman and Master Chief Petty Officer can have a specialisation as part of their regular rank insignia, the only corps where the insignia varies is within the Machinist Corps, where both NCO and SNCO have a different insignia, this also helps determine their qualifications and what they are responsible for.

The most Senior Non-Commissioned Officer, Fleet Master Chief Petty Officer, holds no specific specialisation. The SNCO would have been a specialist at a lower rank. This sailor would also be the overseer of each of the Corps, ensuring that this branch's members are fully trained and equipped.

Officer ranks

Enlisted ranks

Air Force

Officer ranks

Enlisted ranks

Historical ranks
The ranks were introduced in 1968, based on design by the Central American Defense Council (CONDECO).
Officers

Enlisted

References

 
 

Military of Bolivia
Bolivia